The Newark Skeeters was an American soccer club based in Newark, New Jersey and was a member of the American Soccer League and the Eastern Soccer League.

History
In December 1924, Tom Adam, former manager of West Hudson A.A., became the manager of the Skeeters.  In 1928, the American Soccer League suspended Newark when the team defied the league's boycott of the National Challenge Cup.  The Skeeters then joined two other ASL teams, Bethlehem Steel and the New York Giants, in the newly created Eastern Professional Soccer League.  The club folded upon the merger of the ASL and ESL after the fall 1929 season.

Year-by-year

References

Defunct soccer clubs in New Jersey
American Soccer League (1921–1933) teams
Eastern Professional Soccer League (1928–29) teams
1929 disestablishments in New Jersey
Sports in Newark, New Jersey
Association football clubs disestablished in 1929